Jesús Morales Flores (born 19 July 1946) is a Mexican politician affiliated with the PRI. He currently serves as Deputy of the LXII Legislature of the Mexican Congress representing Puebla. He also served as Deputy during the LIX Legislature.

References

1946 births
Living people
Politicians from Puebla
Institutional Revolutionary Party politicians
20th-century Mexican politicians
21st-century Mexican politicians
Meritorious Autonomous University of Puebla alumni
Members of the Congress of Puebla
Deputies of the LXII Legislature of Mexico
Members of the Chamber of Deputies (Mexico) for Puebla